Massara is a surname. Notable people with the surname include:

Carlos Alberto Massara (born 1978), Argentine footballer
Indiana Massara (born 2002), Australian singer, actress, model, and Internet personality
Mark Massara, American surfer and environmentalist
Pino Massara (1931–2013), Italian musician, composer, record producer and conductor
Rooney Massara (born 1943), English rower

Other uses
"Massara (song)", a 2019 song by Kana-Boon